Gega may refer to:

 , a tributary of the Bzyb River of Georgia
 Gega, Bulgaria, a village in Bulgaria
 Gega Point, a promontory in Antarctica
 Gega (surname), an Albanian surname (including a list of people with the name)
 Gega Diasamidze (born 1992), Georgian footballer
 GEGA

See also 
 Carl Ritter von Ghega, Austrian railway engineer
 Jega (disambiguation)
 Giga (disambiguation)